Army of One is a 2016 American comedy film directed by Larry Charles and written by Rajiv Joseph and Scott Rothman. The film stars Nicolas Cage, Wendi McLendon-Covey, Rainn Wilson, Russell Brand, Denis O'Hare, Paul Scheer, and Will Sasso.

The film was released through video on demand and select theaters on November 4, 2016, before being released on DVD and Blu-ray on November 15, 2016, by Dimension Films.

In a 2020 interview, Cage revealed that the released version of the film was recut by Bob Weinstein without Charles' permission and that the latter's original version remains unreleased.

Premise

The film follows Gary Faulkner, an ex-construction contractor and unemployed handy man who believes that God has sent him to capture Osama bin Laden in Pakistan. The story is based on the real-life Faulkner, who traveled to Pakistan looking for bin Laden.

Cast
Nicolas Cage as Gary Brooks Faulkner
Wendi McLendon-Covey as Marci Mitchell	
Rainn Wilson as Agent Simons 		
Russell Brand as God		
Denis O'Hare as Agent Doss	
Paul Scheer as Pickles
Adrian Martinez as Actor
Matthew Modine as Dr. Rose 
Will Sasso as Roy
Amar Chadha-Patel as Osama bin Laden

Production
On January 21, 2015, it was announced Larry Charles would direct the film, with Nicolas Cage starring as Gary Faulkner, a handyman from Colorado who receives a vision telling him to go to Pakistan to capture Osama Bin Laden. On February 19, 2015, Wendi McLendon-Covey joined the cast. On April 16, 2015, Russell Brand, Denis O’Hare, Ken Marino, Paul Scheer and Rainn Wilson joined the cast of the film. Principal photography began on March 30, 2015, and ended on May 22, 2015.

Release
The film was released on November 4, 2016, through video on demand and select theaters before being released through DVD and Blu-ray on November 15, 2016.

Reception
The film received negative reviews. It currently holds a 25% rating on Rotten Tomatoes based on 12 reviews, with an average rating of 4.3/10.

References

External links
 
 
 

2016 films
2010s adventure comedy films
American adventure comedy films
Films directed by Larry Charles
Films set in Pakistan
Films shot in Morocco
Dimension Films films
Films scored by David Newman
2016 comedy films
2010s English-language films
2010s American films